Walter James Roman (1 July 1880  – 28 July 1916) also known by the nickname of "Rattler", was an English rugby union and professional rugby league footballer who played in the 1900s and 1910s. He played representative level rugby union (RU) for Somerset, and at club level for Bridgwater Dreadnaughts and Bridgwater & Albion RFC (captain), alongside Robert Dibble and Tommy Woods, and representative level rugby league (RL) for Great Britain (non-Test matches), England and Wales and the West of England, and at club level for Rochdale Hornets (captain), again alongside Tommy Woods, as a forward (prior to the specialist positions of), during the era of contested scrums.

Background
Walter Roman was born in Bridgwater, Somerset, he served with the Somerset Light Infantry in the Second Boer War and Cawnpore (Kanpur, India), from 1899 to 1907, and later in World War I. On the first day of the Battle of the Somme at Beaumont-Hamel on Saturday 1 July 1916, his 36th birthday, he was admitted to the 12th Field Ambulance with hand, thigh, and leg injuries. He was evacuated from France on Wednesday 5 July 1916, and hospitalised in Cheltenham, his health initially appeared to improve, however he subsequently died of his wounds in Cheltenham.

Playing career

International honours
Walter Roman won a cap for England (RL) while at Rochdale Hornets in the 16–12 victory over Wales at Knowsley Road, St. Helens on Saturday 14 February 1914.

Roman was selected for Great Britain while at Rochdale Hornets for the 1914 Great Britain Lions tour of Australia and New Zealand, he played in seven non-Test matches, and scored one try.

Regional honours
Roman represented Wales and the West of England (RL) while at Rochdale Hornets in the 3–23 defeat by Australia on the 1911–12 Kangaroo tour of Great Britain match at Ashton Gate, Bristol in November 1911.

County honours
Roman represented Somerset (RU) while at Bridgwater & Albion RFC.

County Cup Final appearances
Walter Roman played as a forward, i.e number 11, in Rochdale Hornets' 12–5 victory over Oldham in the 1911–12 Lancashire County Cup Final during the 1911–12 season at Wheater's Field, Broughton, Salford on Saturday 2 December 1911, in front of a crowd of 20,000.

Club career
Roman changed rugby football codes from rugby union to rugby league when he transferred from Bridgwater & Albion to Rochdale Hornets in 1910 for a signing-on fee of £200 (based on increases in average earnings, this would be approximately £76,250.00 in 2018).

Outside of rugby
Roman was the Licensed victualler of the Beehive Public house, St. Mary's Gate, Rochdale.

Genealogical information
Walter Roman and his wife, Henrietta (née Washer), are buried together in Wembdon Road Cemetery in Bridgwater, along with Henrietta's brother, Clifford Washer.

References

External links
53. In loving memory of Walter Roman…
In Honour of The Men Of Bridgwater Who Gave Their Lives In The Great War 1914–1918

1880 births
1916 deaths
Bridgwater & Albion RFC players
British Army personnel of the Second Boer War
British Army personnel of World War I
British military personnel killed in the Battle of the Somme
England national rugby league team players
English rugby league players
English rugby union players
Great Britain national rugby league team players
Publicans
Rochdale Hornets captains
Rochdale Hornets players
Rugby league forwards
Rugby league players from Somerset
Rugby union players from Bridgwater
Somerset County RFU players
Somerset Light Infantry soldiers
Military personnel from Somerset